Hayati Hamzaoğlu (3 April 1933 – 16 April 2000) was a Turkish actor.

Biography
Hamzaoğlu was born in Trabzon.  After leaving school, he began working in a number of different jobs such as a shoemaker and a goldsmith. He started his acting career in 1953 in a small part in Köy Çocuğu. In 1961, he first acted in a main role and gained fame later playing villainous characters.

He won the "Best supporting actor" award twice at the Antalya Golden Orange Film Festival for his roles in Bir Çirkin Adam and Tatar Ramazan. Additionally, he was awarded "Best supporting actor" at the 1969 Adana Golden Cocoon Festival for his performance in Kuyu.  He died, aged 67, in Antalya.

Filmography

 Tomurcuk - 1994 
 Gönlüm Haktan Yana - 1994 
 Tatar Ramazan Sürgünde - 1992 
 Tatar Ramazan - 1990 
 Oy Bebek - 1990 
 Alev Gibi Bir Kız - 1990 
 Leke - 1989 
 Aşka Vakit Yok - 1988 
 Canım - 1988 
 Her şey Güzeldi - 1988 
 Mayın - 1987 
 Hacer Ana ve Oğulları - 1987 
 Sultan - 1987 
 Çakırcalı Mehmet Efe - 1987 
 Efeler Diyarı - 1987 
 Kan Çiçek Açtı - 1987 
 Kuşatma 2 / Şok - 1987 
 Yaralı Can - 1987 
 Kuruluş / Osmancık - 1987 
 Yaygara 86 - 1986 
 Çoban Aşkı - 1986 
 Kral Affetmez - 1986 
 Oteldeki Cinayet - 1986 
 Seni Sevmeyen Ölsün - 1986 
 Veda Türküsü - 1986 
 Veda - 1986
 Çalıkuşu - 1986 
 Büyük Günah - 1985 
 Eroin Hattı - 1985 
 Sevgi Damlacıkları - 1985 
 Geçim Otobüsü - 1984 
 Damga - 1984 
 Karanfilli Naciye - 1984 
 Dertlerin Sahibi - 1984
 Gecelerin Adamı - 1984 
 Dil Yarası - 1984 
 Halk Düşmanı - 1984 
 Sevdalandım - 1984 
 Çocuklar Çiçektir - 1983 
 Can Kurban - 1983 
 Kahır - 1983 
 Çelik Mezar - 1983 
 İkimiz De Sevdik - 1983 
 Kahreden Kurşun - 1983 
 Ağlayan Gülmedi mi? - 1982 
 Tomruk - 1982 
 Kaçak - 1982 
 Kader Bize Düşman mı? - 1982 
 Sevenler Ölmez - 1982 
 Gülsüm Ana - 1982 
 Leyla İle Mecnun- 1982 
 Sevdalım - 1981 
 Takip - 1981 
 Dört Kardeşe Dört Gelin - 1981 
 Acı Gerçekler - 1981 
 Yasak Aşk - 1981 
 Ayrılık Kolay Değil - 1980 
 Akrep Yuvası - 1977 
 Tepedeki Ev - 1976 
 Bitmeyen Şarkı - 1976 
 Mağlup Edilemeyenler (film, 1976)- 1976 
 Kara Murat Kara Şövalyeye Karşı - 1975 
 Ağrı Dağı Efsanesi - 1975 
 En Büyük Patron - 1975 
 Kıbrıs Fedaileri - 1975 
 Kral Benim - 1975 
 Her Yol Sana Helal - 1975 
 Şafakta Buluşalım - 1975 
 Ah Nerede - 1975 
 Sahipsizler - 1974 
 Öfkenin Bedeli - 1974 
 Dadaş Rıfat - 1974 
 Hamama Giren Terler - 1974 
 İntikam - 1974 
 Türk Aslanları - 1974 
 Kızgın Toprak - 1973 
 Yanaşma - 1973 
 Bilal-i Habeşi - 1973 
 Karateci Kız - 1973 
 Çılgın Gangster - 1973 
 Maceraya Bayılırım - 1973 
 Vahşet - 1973 
 Bu Toprağın Kızı - 1973 
 Kara Osman - 1973 
 Siyah Eldivenli Adam - 1973 
 Malkoçoğlu Kurt Bey - 1972 
 Aslanların Ölümü - 1972 
 Süper Adam İstanbul'da - 1972 
 Baskın - 1972 
 Delioğlan - 1972 
 Korkusuz Aşıklar - 1972 
 Bitirim Kemal - 1972 
 Cevriye'nin Kızları - 1972 
 Çöl Kartalı - 1972 
 Deli - 1972 
 Hesabı Kim Ödeyecek - 1972 
 Hesapta Bu Yoktu - 1972 
 Kamalının İntikamı - 1972 
 Kan Dökmez Remzi - 1972 
 Sarı Öküz Parası - 1972 
 Tövbekar - 1972 
 Kardeş Kurşunu - 1972 
 Çirkin Ve Cesur - 1971 
 Vurguncular - 1971 
 Rüzgar Murat - 1971 
 Donkişot Sahte Şövalye - 1971 
 Zapata - 1971 
 Ağıt - 1971 
 Avare Kalbim - 1971 
 İki Yosmaya Bir Kurşun - 1971 
 İntikam Saati - 1971 
 İntikam Kartalları - 1971 
 Kara Cellat - 1971 
 Kara Memed - 1971 
 Kerem İle Aslı - 1971 
 Mezarını Kaz Beni Bekle - 1971 
 Öldüren Yumruk - 1971 
 Sevimli Hırsız - 1971 
 Şahinler Diyarı - 1971 
 Şeytana Uyduk Bir Kere - 1971 
 Beş İdamlık Adam - 1971 
 Umutsuzlar - 1971 
 Keloğlan Aramızda - 1971 
 Acı - 1971 
 İmzam Kanla Yazılır - 1970 
 Meçhul Kadın - 1970 
 Kıskanırım Seni - 1970 
 Kara Peçe - 1970 
 Ham Meyva - 1970 
 Dağların Kartalı - 1970 
 Adım Kan Soyadım Silah - 1970 
 Anadolu Kini - 1970 
 Asi Ve Cesur - 1970 
 Aşk Ve Tabanca - 1970 
 Çarşambayı Sel Aldı - 1970 
 Dönme Bana Sevgilim - 1970 
 Dört Kabadayı - 1970 
 Günahsız Katiller - 1970 
 Yiğitlerin Dönüşü - 1970 
 Öleceksek Ölelim - 1970 
 Cesur Kabadayı - 1969 
 Günah Bende mi? - 1969 
 Bir Çirkin Adam - 1969 
 Kanlı Şafak - 1969 
 Kendi Düşen Ağlamaz - 1969 
 Kanlı Aşk - 1969 
 Ölüm Şart Oldu - 1969 
 Sürgünler - 1969 
 Yiğit Anadolu'dan Çıkar - 1969 
 Çılgınlar Cehennemi - 1969 
 Osman Efe - 1969 
 İki Günahsız Kız - 1969 
 Gül Ayşe - 1969 
 Vatansızlar - 1969 
 Yılın Kadını Değil - 1969 
 Aç Kurtlar - 1969 
 Toprağın Gelini - 1968 
 Beyoğlu Canavarı - 1968 
 Can Pazarı - 1968 
 Seyyit Han - 1968 
 Affedilmeyen Suç - 1968 
 Beş Asi Adam - 1968 
 Sinanoğlu'nun Dönüşü - 1968 
 Kuyu - 1968 
 Paydos - 1968 
 Beşikteki Miras - 1968 
 Köroğlu - 1968 
 Ortaşark Yanıyor - 1967 
 Şeytanın Oğlu - 1967 
 Çelik Bilek - 1967 
 Kurbanlık Katil - 1967 
 Kanunsuz Toprak - 1967 
 Türk Komandoları - 1967 
 Killing Canilere Karşı - 1967 
 Silahları Ellerinde Öldüler - 1967 
 Bir Millet Uyanıyor - 1966 (Bigalı Deli Ömer) 
 Bıçaklar Fora - 1966 
 Silahlar Patlayınca - 1966 
 Anadolu Kanunu - 1966 
 Beyoğlu'nda Vuruşanlar - 1966 
 Fedailer - 1966 
 Mezarını Hazırla - 1966 
 Gavur Dağın Eşkiyası - 1966 
 Aşk Mücadelesi - 1966 
 Dişi Kartal - 1966 
 Haracıma Dokunma - 1965 
 Murat'ın Türküsü - 1965 
 Üçünüzü De Mıhlarım - 1965 
 Yaralı Kartal - 1965 
 Davudo - 1965 
 Büyük Şehrin Kanunu - 1965 
 Yalancı - 1965 
 Hülya - 1965 
 Akrep Kuyruğu - 1965 
 Bitmeyen Kavga - 1965 
 Yarına Boş Ver - 1965 
 Ölüm Çemberi - 1965 
 Şeytanın Kurbanları - 1965 
 Sokaklar Yanıyor - 1965 
 Silaha Yeminliydim - 1965 
 Duvarların Ötesi - 1964 
 İstanbul'un Kızları - 1964 
 Kanun Karşısında - 1964 
 Atçalı Kel Mehmet - 1964 
 Keşanlı Ali Destanı - 1964 
 Fatoş'un Fendi Tayfur'u Yendi - 1964 
 Cehennem Arkadaşları - 1964 
 Abidik Gubidik - 1964 
 Harmandalı Efe'nin İntikamı - 1963 
 Beş Kardeştiler - 1962 
 Can Evimden Vurdular - 1962 
 Kanun Kanundur - 1962 
 Aramıza Kan Girdi - 1962 
 Baharın Gülleri Açtı - 1961 
 Ölüm Kayalıkları - 1961 
 Kızıl Vazo - 1961 
 Telli Kurşun - 1960 
 Sonsuz Acı - 1960 
 Gecelerin Ötesi - 1960 
 Kara Sevdalı Yarim - 1959 
 Dokuz Dağın Efesi - 1958 
 Doksan Dokuz Mustafa - 1958 
 Yayla Güzeli Gül Ayşe - 1956 
 Köyün Çocuğu - 1953

References

External links

1933 births
2000 deaths
People from Trabzon
Turkish male film actors
Turkish male stage actors
Turkish male television actors
Deaths from cancer in Turkey
Golden Orange Life Achievement Award winners
20th-century Turkish male actors